Richard Robert Jeffrey (24 November 1917 – 9 October 1953) was a British bobsledder who competed in the late 1940s. At the 1948 Winter Olympics in St. Moritz, he finished 15th in the four-man event.

References

1948 bobsleigh four-man results
Bobsledding four-man results: 1948-64
British Olympic Association profile
Richard Jeffrey's profile at Sports Reference.com

1917 births
1953 deaths
Bobsledders at the 1948 Winter Olympics
Olympic bobsledders of Great Britain
British male bobsledders